Belarus is scheduled to compete at the 2017 World Aquatics Championships in Budapest, Hungary from 14 July to 30 July.

Medalists

Diving

Belarus has entered 5 divers (four male and one female).

Men

Women

Mixed

High diving

Belarus qualified one male and one female high divers.

Swimming

Belarusian swimmers have achieved qualifying standards in the following events (up to a maximum of 2 swimmers in each event at the A-standard entry time, and 1 at the B-standard):

Men

Women

Synchronized swimming

Belarus's synchronized swimming team consisted of 10 athletes (10 female).

Women

 Legend: (R) = Reserve Athlete

References

Nations at the 2017 World Aquatics Championships
Belarus at the World Aquatics Championships
2017 in Belarusian sport